John Henry Walrath (October 10, 1866 - June 24, 1948) was a lawyer and politician from the United States. He was the mayor of Syracuse, New York for two terms as a Democrat from 1922 to 1925.

Walrath was born in Chittenango, New York in 1866. He studied law and was admitted to the bar in 1889. In 1916, he was elected district attorney for Onondaga County, a first for a Democrat in the county.

He was elected Syracuse mayor in November 1921, the first Democrat in 20 years in the Republican stronghold city, defeating Republican nominee Deforest Settle.(11 November 1921). John H. Walrath, Fayetteville Bulletin(1 November 1925). Republican Split in Syracuse, The New York Times   

Walrath died in Syracuse on June 24, 1948 at age 81.

References

1866 births
1948 deaths
Mayors of Syracuse, New York
20th-century American politicians
People from Chittenango, New York